Fire Station No. 30, Engine Company No. 30 is a historic fire station and engine company in the South Los Angeles area of Los Angeles, California.

Closed in 1980, the building is now home to the African American Firefighter Museum (AAFFM). The AAFFM features vintage fire equipment and apparatus, memorabilia, histories and photos of pioneering African American firefighters in Los Angeles. Other displays include photos, artifacts and memorabilia of African American firefighters, officers and historical women fire service professionals from around the country. The Museum is open to the public and is strictly volunteer and donation driven.

History
The two-story structure was designed in the Prairie School style and was built in 1913.

The structure was listed on the National Register of Historic Places in 2009 pursuant to the registration requirements for fire stations set forth in a multiple property submission study, the African Americans in Los Angeles MPS. It was the first of two all-black segregated fire stations in Los Angeles. Fire Station No. 30, and its resident Engine Company No. 30, was segregated in 1924. It remained segregated until 1956 when the Los Angeles Fire Department was integrated.  According to the registration form supporting the station's listing on the National Register, "All-black fire stations were simultaneous representations of racial segregation and sources of community pride."

Other buildings listed pursuant to the same African Americans in Los Angeles MPS include Fire Station No. 14 (the second all-black segregated fire station in Los Angeles), Angelus Funeral Home, Lincoln Theater, Second Baptist Church, 28th Street YMCA, Prince Hall Masonic Temple, 52nd Place Historic District, 27th Street Historic District.

See also
National Register of Historic Places listings in Los Angeles, California
Los Angeles Fire Department Museum and Memorial
Los Angeles Fire Department
The Stentorians

References

External links

Official website of the African American Firefighter Museum

 

Firefighting museums in California
Museums in Los Angeles
South Los Angeles
Fire stations on the National Register of Historic Places in Los Angeles
Defunct fire stations in California
Fire stations completed in 1913
1913 establishments in California
1910s architecture in the United States
Prairie School architecture in California
African-American segregation in the United States
African-American museums in California